The Acho Dene Koe First Nation is a Dene band government based in  Fort Liard, Northwest Territories, Canada.  Its main community is the Hamlet of Fort Liard. Acho Dene Koe First Nation has an existing treaty land claim settlement with the Governments of Canada, Northwest Territories, Yukon and British Columbia. It is a signatory government to Treaty 11 and is a member government of the Dehcho First Nations Tribal Council.  Registered population is 648, 116 of whom live off-reserve. As of May 2017, Gene Hope was elected as Chief.

References

External links
ADKFN official website
Indian and Northern Affairs Canada First Nation Detail
Indian and Northern Affairs Canada Reserves/Settlements/Villages Detail
Indian and Northern Affairs Canada Registered Population

Dene governments
First Nations in the Northwest Territories